Stetskiv, also transliterated Steckiw, is a Ukrainian surname. Notable people with the surname include:

 Olena Stetskiv (born 1994), Ukrainian luger
 Ostap Steckiw (1924–2001), Canadian soccer player

Ukrainian-language surnames
Patronymic surnames